Sitting Bull is a 1954 American-Mexican Eastmancolor Western film directed by Sidney Salkow and René Cardona that was filmed in Mexico in CinemaScope. In a greatly fictionalised form, it depicts the war between Sitting Bull and the American forces, leading up to the Battle of the Little Bighorn and Custer's Last Stand. It was the first independent production to be filmed in the CinemaScope process. Featuring sympathetic portrayals of Sitting Bull and  Crazy Horse, The New York Times called it a "Crazy Horse opera".

Plot
Major Robert Parrish (Dale Robertson) of the 7th Cavalry is considered by some to be his own worst enemy because he's not a "team player". Formerly one of the youngest Colonels in the Union Army during the American Civil War, he is now a company commander under Lt. Colonel (formerly Brevet Major General during the Civil War) George Armstrong Custer (Douglas Kennedy). His fiancée Kathy (Mary Murphy), daughter of Parrish's commanding general, breaks off their engagement because he has not risen in rank.

Parrish gains no friends amongst the civilian community when he chastises them and threatens to "break heads" when they violate Sioux lands. Custer and Parrish's exasperated General and once prospective father-in-law reassigns Parrish and his company to the Bureau of Indian Affairs where Parrish is outraged at the treatment of the Indians and refuses to carry out the orders of the Indian Agent to shoot his escaping charges. Parrish is court martialed and visits his former commanding general—now President of the United States--Ulysses S. Grant—who demotes him to Captain. Parrish convinces the President to come to the Western frontier to meet Sitting Bull and prevent a war.

Back in the West, now Captain Parrish meets Kathy who has announced her engagement with Charles Wentworth (William Hopper), a former major and now a war correspondent. Using captured Indians, including Sam, a former slave now a Sioux, Parrish meets with Sitting Bull (J. Carrol Naish) who agrees to meet the President in a secret meeting. Further conflicts with the Sioux lead Custer to lead his Regiment out assigning Parrish to guard supplies.

Following the Battle of the Little Bighorn that eliminates Custer, most of his men, and his romantic rival Wentworth, Parrish tries to befriend Sitting Bull and Crazy Horse (Iron Eyes Cody). As Parrish knows the US Army's plan of attack, he leads the Sioux to safety in the North. Parrish is court-martialed again, stripped of his rank, and sentenced to death by firing squad for treason.

As the execution is about to take place, Sitting Bull comes to the fort to speak with President Grant. Parrish had told him "the Great Chief will understand," believing he would show mercy to him because his only intention was to prevent more killing. Sitting Bull's pleads with Grant to spare his life. Grant then commutes his sentence.

Cast
 Dale Robertson as Major Robert 'Bob' Parrish
 Mary Murphy as Kathy Howell
 J. Carrol Naish as Sitting Bull
 John Litel as Gen. Wilford Howell
 Joel Fluellen as Sam
 Iron Eyes Cody as Crazy Horse (credited as "Famous T.V. Star" and technical adviser)
 John Hamilton as President Ulysses S. Grant
 Douglas Kennedy as Col. George Armstrong Custer
 William Tannen as O'Connor
 William Hopper as Charles Wentworth

Production
It was first announced that Boris Karloff would play the title role, but J. Carrol Naish ended up repeating his role from Annie Get Your Gun. Credited in the film as "Famous T.V. Star" and technical advisor, Iron Eyes Cody played the role of Crazy Horse.
 
Though sympathetic to the Native Americans, Minnesota producer Wilfred R. Frank irritated the Sioux by not filming his epic at the Standing Rock Indian Reservation. One of the first Westerns made in CinemaScope, Frank filmed in Mexico (using Mexican extras) due to cheaper costs. However, according to Cody, Estudios Churubusco overcharged Frank's production by several hundred thousand dollars.

Soon after the filming Dale Robertson and Mary Murphy married each other, but the marriage was annulled after six months because Robertson did not want any children.

Quotes
When the white man wins, you call it a victory; when the Indian wins, you call it a massacre - Sitting Bull

Legacy
Salkow and Cody later reteamed for the 1965 film The Great Sioux Massacre for Columbia Pictures that used stock footage from Sitting Bull.

Notes

External links
 
 
 
 

1954 films
1954 Western (genre) films
American Western (genre) films
CinemaScope films
Cultural depictions of Crazy Horse
Cultural depictions of George Armstrong Custer
Cultural depictions of Sitting Bull
Cultural depictions of Ulysses S. Grant
Films about Native Americans
Films directed by Sidney Salkow
Films scored by Raoul Kraushaar
Films shot in Mexico
Mexican Western (genre) films
Film
United Artists films
Western (genre) cavalry films
1950s English-language films
1950s American films
1950s Mexican films